"I Like to Move It" is a song by American solo project Reel 2 Real (Erick Morillo), featuring ragga vocals by Trinidad and Tobago rapper The Mad Stuntman (Mark Quashie). Released in 1993, as the second single from their debut album, Move It! (1994), it appeared on the US Billboard Hot 100 chart in 1994, peaking at number 89, and reached number five on the UK Singles Chart the same year. It was a number-one hit in Belgium, France, the Netherlands, and Zimbabwe. On the Billboard Dance Club Play chart, it peaked at number eight. On the second International Dance Awards in 1995, it won an award in the category for Best Tune of the Year.

The song was adapted in a Spanish version by Dominican merengue-house duo Sandy & Papo, as "Mueve, mueve", in 1995. In 2021, it was reworked in a remix version by Tunisian DJ-producer duo, Outrage and Spanish DJ and vocalist Alejandro under the title, "Move It".

Chart performance
"I Like to Move It" was very successful on the charts across several continents. It remains the project's biggest and best-known hit, peaking at number-one on the singles chart in Belgium, France, Greece and the Netherlands. The single entered the top 10 also in Austria (2), Finland (10), Germany (3), Iceland (6), Ireland (5), Lithuania, Scotland (8), Spain (7), Switzerland (4) and the United Kingdom, as well as on the Eurochart Hot 100, where it reached number two. In the UK, it peaked at number five in its eight week on the UK Singles Chart, on March 27. But it topped the UK Dance Singles Chart on February 26. Outside Europe, "I Like to Move It" peaked at number-one also on the RPM Dance/Urban chart in Canada and in Zimbabwe. It went into the top 10 in Australia and on the Billboard Dance Club Play chart in the US. On the Billboard Hot 100, the single reached number 89. In New Zealand, it was a top 20 hit, peaking at number 14. 

"I Like to Move It" was awarded with a gold record in Australia, France, Germany, the Netherlands and the UK.

Critical reception
In 2020, an editor from AllMusic stated that Reel 2 Real's "I Like to Move It" "still sounds as hot today as it did when it first came out in 1993. The pulsing synths and sirens of the song made for an instant wall shaker." Larry Flick from Billboard noted that here, "reggae beat sensibilities are woven around loose house and rave keyboards. The Mad Stuntman toasts with predictable speed, cutting through the fairly thick groove with a raspy edge. His energy transforms what could have been a laid-back record into a rousing peak-hour anthem." Caroline Sullivan from The Guardian complimented its "growly catchiness". In his weekly UK chart commentary, James Masterton wrote, "Straight from nowhere come Reel 2 Real to become the first dance act for several months to charge straight into the Top 10 without a previous hit to their name." 

Maria Jimenez from Music & Media remarked that the "boomin'" and "grinding scorcher is gaining much audience and radio support on this side of the ocean." Andy Beevers from Music Week rated the song four out of five, adding, "Originally released by Strictly Rhythm, this inspired combination of NY house rhythms and The Mad Stuntman's ragga rhymes has been generating plenty of interest on import." Another editor, Alan Jones complimented it as a "fierce ragga house anthem". James Hamilton from the RM Dance Update declared it as a "madly happy gruff ragga rapped bogle/soca-style leaper".

Music video
The accompanying music video for "I Like to Move It" was directed by Craig K. McCall. It was shot in New York City, with notable filming locations including Times Square and Flatbush. The video received heavy rotation on MTV Europe and was A-listed on Germany's VIVA.

Usage in media
The song appeared in the films The Master of Disguise and Saving Silverman. The song appeared in the American Dad! episode "The Dentist's Wife".

A reworked parody version, titled "I Like to Shake It, Shake It", was used in a April 2018 commercial for the dishwasher brand Fairy. It was posted on their official UK YouTube channel, but it was since deleted.

The song has also been used in numerous other advertisements and was used in the video games SingStar Dance and the first Just Dance. Basshunter sampled "I Like to Move It" on his track "Saturday".

In the second season of Norwegian reality singing competition Maskorama, based on the South Korean television series King of Mask Singer, the song was performed in episode three in November 2021. It was performed by the contestant masked as a Nisse, which later was revealed to be Abid Raja.

A new Fortnite dance emote based on the song was introduced on January 28, 2022.

A parody of the song, "I Like to Voost It", is featured in a 2022 American commercial for Voost.

In February of 2023, the song was featured in a television commercial for the U.S. Postal Service.

Madagascar franchise
Many versions of the song have frequently been used throughout the Madagascar franchise, with many of them with lyrics changed or altered to match with each film's plot and the film's subject matter (usually replacing "sexy" with "sassy"). The first film used a version recorded by Sacha Baron Cohen, the second film used a version by will.i.am, and the third film used a mix-up with the original tune "Afro Circus" in the number "Afro Circus/I Like to Move It". The "I like to move it" part was sung by Baron Cohen in the film while Danny Jacobs, who voices King Julien in the spinoff TV series and games, sang it on the soundtrack, in both versions alongside Chris Rock. The original version appeared in the first and last episode of the Madagascar Netflix series All Hail King Julien and the "Afro Circus/I Like to Move It" tune was played near the start of the Madagascar spin-off film Penguins of Madagascar. Jacobs, as Julien, also sang a Christmas song called "Santa Claus Is Coming to Madagascar", a modified cover of "Santa Claus Is Coming to Town" which uses the same beat as "I Like to Move It" in Merry Madagascar.

The song was also included in the stage adaptation of the film, sung again by King Julien.

Accolades

Track listings

 CD single, US
 "I Like to Move It" (US radio edit) – 3:43
 "I Like to Move It" (Erick 'More' club mix) – 5:45
 "I Like to Move It" (Reel 2 Reel dub) – 5:00
 "I Like to Move It" (More's instrumental) – 4:35
 "Toety" - 5:00

 CD maxi
 "I Like to Move It" (UK radio edit) – 3:52
 "I Like to Move It" (UK vocal house remix) – 5:47
 "I Like to Move It" (UK moody house remix) – 5:05
 "I Like to Move It" (Reel 2 Reel dub) – 4:25

 CD single
 "I Like to Move It" (radio edit) – 3:52
 "I Like to Move It" (More's instrumental) – 3:57

 CD seven-track remixes
 "I Like to Move It" (UK radio edit) – 3:52
 "I Like to Move It" (Erick 'More' club mix) – 5.51
 "I Like to Move It" (UK vocal house remix) – 5.47
 "I Like to Move It" (UK moody house remix) – 6.19
 "I Like to Move It" (Vocal Dattiman remix) – 6.37
 "I Like to Move It" (UK Dattiman dub) – 6.22
 "I Like to Move It" (Reel 2 Reel dub) – 4.25

Charts

Weekly charts

Year-end charts

Certifications

Release history

References

External links
 Erick Morillo website
 

1993 songs
1993 singles
Reel 2 Real songs
Bob Sinclar songs
Crazy Frog songs
Dutch Top 40 number-one singles
Music Week number-one dance singles
Number-one singles in the Netherlands
Number-one singles in Zimbabwe
SNEP Top Singles number-one singles
Ultratop 50 Singles (Flanders) number-one singles
Songs written by Erick Morillo
Songs written by The Mad Stuntman
Positiva Records singles
Strictly Rhythm singles